PFI may stand for:
 Pay for inclusion (paid inclusion), charge by a search engine to include a Web site in its index
 Pellet Fuels Institute, trade association of the wood pellet fuel industry
 Percy FitzPatrick Institute of African Ornithology
 Performance Freediving International, a freediving organization
 Popular Front of India, an Islamist organisation in India
 Port fuel injection (indirect injection), a type of fuel injection used in automobiles
 Practical Farmers of Iowa, an agriculture NGO in Iowa
 Pre-flight inspection, of an aircraft
 Private finance initiative, a way of funding public sector projects with private capital
 The Prize Fighter Inferno, a musical project of Coheed and Cambria frontman Claudio Sanchez
 Pro forma invoice, a billing document that is not a demand for payment but gives information about a shipment 
 PFI Convention (Convention on the protection of the European Communities' financial interests), a multilateral EU treaty on fraud
 Perspektivnyi Frontovoy Istrebitel ("Perspective Frontline Fighter"), Soviet military aircraft; see Post-PFI Soviet/Russian aircraft projects
 PFIs, or Pharmaceutical Formulation Intermediates, a pharmaceutical term
 Press Freedom Index